Archaeoceti ("ancient whales"), or Zeuglodontes in older literature, is a paraphyletic group of primitive cetaceans that lived from the Early Eocene to the late Oligocene. Representing the earliest cetacean radiation, they include the initial amphibious stages in cetacean evolution, thus are the ancestors of both modern cetacean suborders, Mysticeti and Odontoceti. This initial diversification occurred in the shallow waters that separated India and Asia , resulting in some 30 species adapted to a fully oceanic life. Echolocation and filter-feeding evolved during a second radiation .

All archaeocetes from the Ypresian (56–47.8 mya) and most from the Lutetian (47.8–41.3 mya) are known exclusively from Indo-Pakistan, but Bartonian (41.3–38.0 mya) and Priabonian (38.0–33.9 mya) genera are known from across Earth, including North America, Egypt, New Zealand, and Europe. Although no consensus exists regarding the mode of locomotion of which cetaceans were capable during the late Lutetian, they were very unlikely to be nearly as well-adapted to the open ocean as living cetaceans. They probably reached as far as North America along coastal waters, either around Africa and over to South America, or more likely, over the Tethys Sea (between Eurasia and Africa) and along the coasts of Europe, Greenland, and North America.

The archaeocetes are paraphyletic in relation to their extant modern descendants, the Neoceti (neocetes). Neocetes consist of two subgroups, the toothed whales (odontocetes) and the baleen whales (mysticetes).

Description

Pakicetidae 
They have only been found in sediments from freshwater streams in northwestern India and northern Pakistan, and were probably waders rather than swimmers.

Dozens of fossils are known, but only of skulls, teeth, and jaw fragments; no complete skeletons have been found. The dentition varied; the smallest species had teeth like modern fish eaters, and the largest were more like modern hyenas. The pakicetids may have been predators or carrion feeders. Neither the skull nor the dentition of pakicetids resembles those of modern whales, but the sigmoid process, involucrum, pachyostotic (compact) and rotated ossicles of their ears still reveal their cetacean nature.

Ambulocetidae 
The next diverging family of whales, the Ambulocetidae, were large, already fully aquatic, and crocodile-like with large feet and a strong tail. Sediments indicate that they lived in coastal areas and their compact bones suggest that they were ambush rather than fast-pursuit predators. Also known exclusively from Pakistan and India, the ambulocetids include the oldest known whale, Himalayacetus, which is believed to be , some 4 million years older than the rest of its family.

Of the less than 10 fossils that have been described, one, Ambulocetus natans, is nearly complete and the main source of information concerning early cetacean evolution. The size of a male sea lion, it had a large head with a long snout and robust, strongly worn teeth. The lower jaw shows that Ambulocetus had an unusual soft tissue connecting the back of the jaw to the middle ear — a small equivalent to the large sound-receiving fat pad in modern odontocetes. Its eyes were placed dorsally on the head, but were facing laterally. The musculature of the head, neck, and back was strong and the fluke-less tail was long. The hind limbs were short, but equipped with long feet. The fore limbs were also short and equipped with five short hooves. Ambulocetus probably swam with its hind feet like a modern otter, and was incapable of supporting its own weight on land. It probably was an ambush hunter like modern crocodiles.

Remingtonocetidae 
The Remingtonocetidae had short limbs, and a strong and powerful tail with flattened vertebrae. Their long snout, tiny eyes, and ear morphology suggest their vision was poor and that hearing was their dominant sense. They, too, have only been found in Pakistan and India, and sediments suggest that they lived in turbid waters in coastal areas. Though they were probably able to live on land, they apparently used their tails to swim.

Dozens of fossils have been described, but most are only skulls and lower jaws with few dental and postcranial remains. Remingtonocetids probably varied in size with the smallest species matching Pakicetus and the largest Ambulocetus. Remingtonocetids had longer snouts than other archaeocetes,  except that the cranial morphology also varied considerably, probably reflecting different diets. The eyes were small, but the ears were large and set far apart — probably reflecting an increased emphasis on underwater hearing. The fragmentary remains of remingtonocetid postcrania suggest that they had a long neck and large hind limbs that were probably able to support the body weight on land.

The remaining families and later crown cetaceans form a clade united by six synapomorphies: The anterior margin of external nares is located above or behind the third upper incisor, the rostrum is wide, the supraorbital processes are present but short, the anterior edge of the orbit is located above the second or third upper molar, the postorbital process forms a 90° angle with the sagittal crest, and the cervical vertebrae are short.

Protocetidae 
The Protocetidae, known from both Africa and America, were a diversified family with hind limbs and a strong tail, indicating that they were strong swimmers that colonized shallow and warm oceans, such as reefs. They greatly affected cetacean evolution , because they spread across Earth's oceans. They had long snouts, large eyes, and a nasal opening located farther up the head than in earlier archaeocetes — suggesting they could breathe with the head held horizontally, similar to modern cetaceans — a first step towards a blowhole. Their dentition varied, but started to evolve towards the nonmasticating teeth of modern cetaceans, and they were probably active hunters. Their ability to move on land seems to have been variable: in Rodhocetus and Peregocetus possess a sacroiliac joint, indicating they could move on land. In other genera (Georgiacetus and Aegicetus), the pelvis was not connected to the vertebral column, suggesting the hind limbs could not have supported the body weight. Some genera (Rodhocetus) had large hind feet forming large paddles, while Aegicetus seems to have relied more on its tail to propel itself through the water.

Basilosauridae 
Basilosaurids, which had tiny hind limbs and flipper-shaped fore limbs, were obligatorily aquatic and came to dominate the oceans. They still lacked the echolocation and baleen of modern odontocetes and mysticeti. Basilosaurids and dorudontids are the oldest obligate aquatic cetaceans for which the entire skeleton is known. They display a number of aquatic adaptations not present in earlier archaeocetes: In the vertebral column, the neck vertebrae are short, the thoracic and lumbar vertebrae are of similar length, the sacral vertebrae are unfused, the sacroiliac joints are absent, and the short tail has a ball vertebra (indicating the presence of a fluke). The scapulae are broad and fan-shaped with anterior acromions and small supraspinous fossae. The ulnae are large and have transversely flat olecranons, the wrists and distal forearms are flattened in the plane of the hands, and the hind limbs are tiny.

Taxonomy
The Archaeoceti include five well-established families: The status of the Kekenodontidae is still disputed, and the family is placed in either the Archaeoceti, Mysticeti, or even Delphinoidea.

 Cetartiodactyla
 Archaeoceti
 Pakicetidae
 Pakicetus
 Nalacetus
 Ichthyolestes
 Ambulocetidae
 Ambulocetus
 Gandakasia
 Himalayacetus
 Remingtonocetidae
 Andrewsiphius
 Attockicetus
 Dalanistes
 Kutchicetus
 Remingtonocetus
 Protocetidae
 Georgiacetinae
 Aegicetus (Gingerich et.al. 2019)
 Babiacetus
 Carolinacetus
 Georgiacetus
 Natchitochia
 Pappocetus
 Pontobasileus
 Makaracetinae
 Makaracetus
 Protocetinae
 Aegyptocetus
 Artiocetus
 Crenatocetus
 Dhedacetus
 Gaviacetus
 Indocetus
 Maiacetus
 Peregocetus
 Protocetus
 Qaisracetus
 Rodhocetus
 Takracetus
 Togocetus
 Basilosauridae
 Basilosaurinae
 Basilosaurus
 Basiloterus
 Eocetus
 Platyosphys
 Dorudontinae
 Ancalecetus
 Basilotritus
 Chrysocetus
 Cynthiacetus
 Dorudon
 Masracetus
 Ocucajea
 Pontogeneus
 Saghacetus
 Stromerius
 Supayacetus
 Zygorhiza
 Kekenodontidae
 Kekenodon

Phylogeny

Notes

References

External links
 

 
Paraphyletic groups